France is a 2021 comedy-drama film written and directed by Bruno Dumont. It stars Léa Seydoux, Blanche Gardin, Benjamin Biolay, Emanuele Arioli, Juliane Köhler, Gaëtan Amiel, Jewad Zemmar and Marc Bettinelli.

The film follows the life of a star television journalist caught in a spiral of events that will lead to her downfall. Between drama and comedy, France seeks to compare the intimate and public crisis of a young woman with a portrait of contemporary France. The film had its world premiere at the Cannes Film Festival on 15 July 2021. It was released in France on 25 August 2021 by ARP Selection.

Synopsis
The film is intended in particular to be a satire of the treatment of information by television channels. France de Meurs is a star journalist at a private French television station. Her fame, her way of conceiving reports and programmes, as well as a chain of personal events, will cause a total questioning of her career in media and turn her life upside down, in addition to her struggles with panic attacks and anxiety.

Cast
 Léa Seydoux as France de Meurs
 Blanche Gardin as Lou
 Benjamin Biolay as Fred de Meurs
 Emanuele Arioli as Charles Castro
 Juliane Köhler as Mme Arpel
 Gaëtan Amiel as Joseph de Meurs
 Jewad Zemmar as Baptiste
 Marc Bettinelli as Lolo
 Lucile Roche as Chouchou
 Noura Benbahlouli as Baptiste's mother
 Abdellah Chahouat as Baptiste's father
 Emmanuel Macron as Himself (archive footage, uncredited)

Production
In May 2019, it was announced Léa Seydoux, Blanche Gardin and Benoît Magimel had joined the cast of the film, with Bruno Dumont directing from a screenplay he wrote. In June 2020, the film was re-titled from On a Half Clear Morning to France.

Principal photography began in October 2019.

Release
The film had its world premiere at the Cannes Film Festival on 15 July 2021. It was released in France on 25 August 2021 by ARP Selection.

Critical reception
  In France, the film averages 3.3/5 on AlloCiné from 36 press reviews.

References

External links
 

2021 films
2021 comedy-drama films
2020s French-language films
Belgian comedy-drama films
Films about journalists
Films about road accidents and incidents
Films about television
Films about war correspondents
Films directed by Bruno Dumont
Films postponed due to the COVID-19 pandemic
Films set in Africa
Films set in France
Films set in Paris
Films set in the Alps
Films shot in Apulia
Films shot in Bavaria
Films shot in France
Films shot in Paris
French comedy-drama films
French-language Belgian films
German comedy-drama films
Italian comedy-drama films
2020s French films
Tragicomedy films